Lindenius albilabris  is a Palearctic species of solitary wasp from the Crabronidae.

References

External links
 Images representing Lindenius albilabris 

Hymenoptera of Europe
Crabronidae
Insects described in 1793